Kenavo may refer to:
Kenavo (word), Breton word for goodbye, also used outside Brittany
Kenavo, song by Gérard Jaffrès on the album Au creux de ma terre, by Théodore Botrel or Gilles Servat
Kenavo D, runner-up horse at Equestrian at the 1964 Summer Olympics – Team jumping